Pseudopostega floridensis is a moth of the family Opostegidae. It is only known from southern Florida, United States.

The length of the forewings is about 2.4 mm. Adults are mostly white with a variably distinct dark brown dorsal spot on forewing and dark brown apical spot. Adults have been collected in June and November.

Etymology
The species name is derived from the general type locality, Florida, and -ensis, a suffix denoting place, locality.

External links
A Revision of the New World Plant-Mining Moths of the Family Opostegidae (Lepidoptera: Nepticuloidea)

Opostegidae
Moths described in 2007